Ceroplastes cirripediformis, known generally as the barnacle scale or barnacle wax scale, is a species of soft scale insect in the family Coccidae.

References

External links

Coccidae
Articles created by Qbugbot
Insects described in 1881